Manohar Bhushan Inter College is an educational institution in Izzatnagar, Bareilly, Uttar Pradesh, India. It is run by the Government of Uttar Pradesh and affiliated to the Uttar Pradesh Madhyamik Shiksha Parishad in Allahabad.

History 
Manohar Bhushan Inter College was founded by Manohar Devi and Satya Bhushan in 1945.

References 

High schools and secondary schools in Uttar Pradesh
Intermediate colleges in Uttar Pradesh
Education in Bareilly
Educational institutions established in 1941
1941 establishments in India